Olivier Mutis (born 2 February 1978) is a former French professional tennis player who retired in 2006. He did not win any ATP Tour titles but he won a total of 7 ATP Challenger Series.

His best performance in a Grand Slam was at Roland Garros in 2004, when he reached the fourth round after having defeated World No. 2 Andy Roddick in a second round match. He played his first match in over a year in the Metz International qualifying 2008. He lost to Thierry Ascione 5–7, 6–2, 5–7 in a close match.

He is the only player in history to have won every set he has played against Rafael Nadal on clay.

Junior Grand Slam finals

Singles: 1 (1 title)

Doubles: 1 (1 title)

ATP Challenger and ITF Futures finals

Singles: 16 (12–4)

Doubles: 1 (0–1)

Performance timeline

Singles

External links
 
 

1978 births
Living people
French male tennis players
French expatriate sportspeople in Luxembourg
Sportspeople from Aisne
Wimbledon junior champions
Grand Slam (tennis) champions in boys' singles
Grand Slam (tennis) champions in boys' doubles